is a Japanese politician serving in the House of Representatives. A member of the Liberal Democratic Party, he was selected to become Economic Revitalization Minister in October 2022 upon the cabinet resignation of Daishiro Yamagiwa. Goto previously served as Minister of Health, Labour and Welfare from October 2021 to August 2022.

Career 
A native of Minato, Tokyo and graduate of the University of Tokyo, he joined the Ministry of Finance in 1980.  He also received a master's degree from Brown University as a bureaucrat. After he left the ministry in 1995, he ran unsuccessfully for the House of Representatives as a member of the New Frontier Party. He ran again in 2000 as a member of the Democratic Party of Japan and was elected for the first time.

References

External links 
 Official website in Japanese.

Members of the House of Representatives (Japan)
Living people
1955 births
New Frontier Party (Japan) politicians
20th-century Japanese politicians
Democratic Party of Japan politicians
Liberal Democratic Party (Japan) politicians
21st-century Japanese politicians
Ministers of Health and Welfare of Japan